Trichamoeba is a genus of Amoebozoa.

It includes the species Trichamoeba villosa.

References

Amoebozoa genera